Portsmouth is a town in Newport County, Rhode Island, United States. The population was 17,871 at the 2020 U.S. census. Portsmouth is the second-oldest municipality in Rhode Island, after Providence; it was one of the four colonies which merged to form the Colony of Rhode Island and Providence Plantations, the others being Providence, Newport, and Warwick.

Geography
Most of its land area lies on Aquidneck Island, which it shares with Middletown and Newport. In addition, Portsmouth encompasses some smaller islands, including Prudence Island, Patience Island, Hope Island and Hog Island. Part of the census-designated place of Melville lies within the town boundaries.

History

Portsmouth was settled in 1638 by a group of religious dissenters from Massachusetts Bay Colony, including Dr. John Clarke, William Coddington and Anne Hutchinson. It is named after Portsmouth, Hampshire, England.  Roger Williams convinced the settlers that they should go there instead of settling in the Province of New Jersey, where they had first planned on going.

It was founded by the signers of the Portsmouth Compact.  Its original name was Pocasset and it was officially named Portsmouth on May 12, 1639. It became part of the Colony of Rhode Island and Providence Plantations (see Aquidneck Island) and eventually part of the State of Rhode Island and Providence Plantations, which, as of 2020, is simply the State of Rhode Island.

Schools

Public
The Portsmouth School Department operates public schools:

 Portsmouth High School
 Portsmouth Middle School
 Howard W. Hathaway Elementary School
 Melville Elementary School
 Prudence Island School (a Charter/Co-op "Home School" as of September 2009)

Private
Portsmouth Abbey School (9th Grade through 12th Grade)
Saint Philomena School (Pre-Kindergarten through 8th Grade)
The Pennfield School (Nursery through 8th Grade)

Commerce
Since 1980, Portsmouth has been home to Clements' Marketplace, a large supermarket. In addition, Portsmouth is home to the Portsmouth Business Park, as well as a few small plazas with a variety of businesses. Portsmouth is also home to the Raytheon Missiles & Defense division.

Sports
Portsmouth is the headquarters of US Sailing, the national governing body of sailing in the U.S.  It is also home to the Newport International Polo Series held at Glen Farm.

Portsmouth High School has very successful football, basketball, baseball and soccer teams. All four are regularly among the top five teams in the state.

Music
On September 21, 2017, a plaque was unveiled by Roger Williams University at the Baypoint Inn & Conference Center honoring music icons The Beach Boys.

Demographics

2000 U.S. Census
The 2000 U.S. Census reported that there were 17,149 people, or an increase of 1.7%, residing in the town. There were also 6,758 households, and 4,865 families recorded. The racial makeup of the town was 95.82% White, 1.17% African American, 0.19% Native American, 1.36% Asian, 0.03% Pacific Islander, 0.37% from other races, and 1.05% from two or more races. Hispanic or Latino of any race were 1.45% of the population.

There were 6,758 households, of which 33.4% had children under the age of 18 living with them, 61.1% were married couples living together, 8.0% had a female householder with no husband present, and 28.0% were non-families. 23.3% of all households were made up of individuals, and 10.0% had someone living alone who was 65 years of age or older.  The average household size was 2.53 and the average family size was 3.00.

In the town, the population was spread out, with 25.2% under the age of 18, 5.0% from 18 to 24, 29.5% from 25 to 44, 26.9% from 45 to 64, and 13.5% who were 65 years of age or older.  The median age was 40 years. For every 100 females, there were 96.5 males.  For every 100 females age 18 and over, there were 92.6 males.

The median income for a household in the town was $88,835, and the median income for a family was $108,577. Males had a median income of $46,297 versus $31,745 for females. The per capita income for the town was $46,161.  About 2.0% of families and 3.4% of the population were below the poverty line, including 2.8% of those under age 18 and 6.4% of those age 65 or over.

2010 U.S. Census
The 2010 U.S. Census reported that there were 17,349 people, or an increase of 1.15%, residing in the town. The racial makeup of the town was 94.57% White, 1.35% African American, 1.58% Asian, 0.21% American Indian or Alaskan Native, 0.04% Native Hawaiian or Pacific Islander, 0.40% of some other race, and 1.86% of two or more races.

In the town, 22.98% of the population was under the age of 18 and 16.47% were 65 years of age or older. Females made up 51.03% of the population.

Historic sites and points of interest

 Battle of Rhode Island Site
 Borden Farm 
 Greenvale Farm (1864)
 Green Animals Topiary Garden
 Hog Island Shoal Lighthouse (1901)
 Lawton-Almy-Hall Farm
 Mount Hope Bridge (1929)
 Oak Glen
 Portsmouth Friends Meetinghouse Parsonage and Cemetery
 Prudence Island Lighthouse (1823)
 Union Church (1865)
 Wreck Sites of H.M.S. Cerberus and H.M.S. Lark (1778)

Notable people

 Ade Bethune (died 2002), liturgical artist and Catholic Worker
 Jeremy Clarke (1605–1652), early settler of Portsmouth, served as second governor of Rhode Island colony
 Mike Cloud, running back for the Kansas City Chiefs, New England Patriots, and New York Giants
 Thomas Cornell, one of the earliest settlers of Portsmouth and progenitor of Cornell family in America
 Chris Cosentino, chef and cast member of "The Next Iron Chef"
 Charlie Day, American actor, screenwriter, producer, comedian, and musician
 Sarah J. Eddy (1851–1945), American artist, photographer, and suffragist
 Anthony Harkness (1793–1858), businessman and inventor
 Julia Ward Howe (died 1910), author of "The Battle Hymn of the Republic"
 Anne Hutchinson (died 1643), founded colony of Rhode Island in 1638
 Betty Hutton (died 2007), film actress and singer
 Patrick Kennedy, U.S. congressman for Rhode Island's First district (1995–2011)
 Scotty Kilmer, auto mechanic educator followed by millions on Youtube
 Frances Latham (1610–1677), wife of Governor Jeremy Clarke, early settler of Portsmouth, known as the "mother of governors"
 Ronald Machtley, U.S. congressman, President of Bryant University
 Michelle McGaw, state representative from the Rhode Island House of Representatives representing Little Compton, Tiverton, and Portsmouth
 Peleg Slocum (1654-1733), Quaker, former proprietor of Dartmouth, Massachusetts and former owner of Cuttyhunk Island
 Cole Swider, professional basketball player for the Los Angeles Lakers
 Ryan Westmoreland, former baseball player, Boston Red Sox

Gallery

References
Notes

Further reading
Garman, James E. (1996). Traveling Around Aquidneck Island 1890–1930. Portsmouth: Hamilton Printing. .
Pierce, John T. (1991). Historical Tracts of the Town of Portsmouth. Portsmouth: Hamilton Printing. .

External links

 Town of Portsmouth
 Portsmouth Historical Society

 
Towns in Newport County, Rhode Island
Populated coastal places in Rhode Island
Providence metropolitan area
1638 establishments in Rhode Island
Populated places established in 1638
Towns in Rhode Island